{
	"type": "FeatureCollection",
	"features": [
		{
			"type": "Feature",
			"properties": { "marker-symbol": "monument", "title": "Karitalai" },
			"geometry": { "type": "Point", "coordinates": [80.7048084, 24.0451598] }
		},
		{
			"type": "Feature",
			"properties": { "marker-symbol": "monument", "title": "Khoh" },
			"geometry": { "type": "Point", "coordinates": [80.7158977, 24.3638350] }
		},
		{
			"type": "Feature",
			"properties": { "marker-symbol": "monument", "title": "Sohawal" },
			"geometry": { "type": "Point", "coordinates": [80.7630100, 24.5756679] }
		},
		{
			"type": "Feature",
			"properties": { "marker-symbol": "monument", "title": "Unchehara" },
			"geometry": { "type": "Point", "coordinates": [80.7793384, 24.3813013] }
		}
	]
}
The Uchchhakalpa (IAST: Ucchakalpa) dynasty ruled parts of central India during 5th and 6th centuries. Their territory included north-eastern parts of present-day Madhya Pradesh. Their capital was located at Uchchhakalpa, the present-day Unchehara.

The Uchchhakalpas were neighbours of the Parivrajakas, and appear to have been feudatories of the Gupta Empire. The dynasty is known from inscriptions issued by two of its kings: Jayanatha and Sharvanatha.

History 

Inscriptions of two Uchchhakalpa kings, dated in an unspecified calendar era, are available: Jayanatha (Year 174–182) and Sarvanatha (Year 191–214). The era is now generally identified with the Gupta era (which begins in 318–319 CE), although some earlier scholars identified it as the Kalachuri era (which begins in 248–249 CE). The Uchchhakalpa inscriptions are written in the central Indian variety of the Gupta script. Moreover, the Bhumara stone pillar inscription names the Uchchhakalpa ruler Sharvanatha and the Parivrajaka ruler Hastin as contemporaries. This suggests that both were vassals of the Guptas, and the calendar era mentioned in the Uchchhakalpa inscriptions is the Gupta era.

According to these inscriptions, the earliest king of the dynasty was Oghadeva. He was succeeded by Kumaradeva, Jayasvamin, and Vyaghra. Jayanatha, the dynasty's earliest king attested by his own inscriptions, was a son of king Vyaghra and queen Ajjhitadevi. Jayanatha was succeeded by Sharvanatha, who was his son from queen Murundasvamini. Nothing is known about the successors of Sharvanatha.

Genealogy 

The following kings and queens of the dynasty are known (IAST names):

 Mahārāja Ogha-deva and Mahādevi Kumarā-devī
 Mahārāja Kumarā-deva and Mahādevi Jaya-svāminī
 Mahārāja Jaya-svāmin and Mahādevi Ramā-devī
 Mahārāja Vyāghra and Mahādevi Ajjhita-devī
 Mahārāja Jaya-nātha and Mahādevi Murunda-svaminī, r. c. 493–507 CE
 Mahārāja Śarva-nātha (Sharvanatha), r. c. 508–533 CE

Inscriptions 

The following copper-plate inscriptions from the Uchchhakalpa reign have been discovered.

Inscriptions of a Vakataka feudatory named Vyaghra-deva have been found at Nachna-Ganj. According to one theory, this ruler may be identical with the Vyaghra of Uchchhakalpa dynasty, but this identification is doubtful.

References

Bibliography

External links 
 Uchchhakalpa inscriptions by D.N Lielukhine, Oriental Institute
 Siddham – the South Asia Inscriptions Database: Jayanātha and Śarvanātha

Dynasties of India
History of Madhya Pradesh
Gupta Empire